The History of Benin since the 16th century, for the geographical area included in 1960 in what was then called the Republic of Dahomey before becoming the People's Republic of Benin.

Colonial Benin (formerly, République du Dahomey/Republic of Dahomey)

Dahomey was a French colony of and a part of French West Africa from 1904 to 1959. Under the French, a port was constructed at Cotonou, and railroads were built. School facilities were expanded by Roman Catholic missions. In 1946, Dahomey became an overseas territory with its own parliament and representation in the French national assembly.  On December 4, 1958, it became the Republic of Dahomey.

Post-colonial Benin

Between 1960 and 1972, a succession of military coups brought about many changes of government. The last of these brought to power Major Mathieu Kérékou as the head of a regime professing strict Marxist-Leninist principles. By 1975 the Republic of Dahomey changed its name to the People's Republic of Benin. The People's Revolutionary Party of Benin (PRPB) remained in complete power until the beginning of the 1990s. Kérékou, encouraged by France and other democratic powers, convened a national conference that introduced a new democratic constitution and held presidential and legislative elections. Kérékou's principal opponent at the presidential poll, and the ultimate victor, was Prime Minister Nicéphore Soglo. Supporters of Soglo also secured a majority in the National Assembly. Benin was thus the first African country to effect successfully the transition from dictatorship to a pluralistic political system.

In the second round of National Assembly elections held in March 1995, Zoglo's political vehicle, the Parti de la Renaissance du Benin, was the largest single party but lacked an overall majority. The success of a party formed by supporters of ex-president Kérékou, who had officially retired from active politics, allowed him to stand successfully at both the 1996 and 2001 presidential elections.

During the 2001 elections, however, alleged irregularities and dubious practices led to a boycott of the run-off poll by the main opposition candidates. The four top-ranking contenders following the first round presidential elections were Mathieu Kérékou (incumbent) 45.4%, Nicephore Soglo (former president) 27.1%, Adrien Houngbédji (National Assembly Speaker) 12.6%, and Bruno Amoussou (Minister of State) 8.6%. The second round balloting, originally scheduled for March 18, 2001, was postponed for days because both Soglo and Houngbedji withdrew, alleging electoral fraud. This left Kérékou to run against his own Minister of State, Amoussou, in what was termed a "friendly match."

In December 2002, Benin held its first municipal elections since before the institution of Marxism-Leninism. The process was smooth with the significant exception of the 12th district council for Cotonou, the contest that would ultimately determine who would be selected for the mayoralty of the capital city. That vote was marred by irregularities, and the electoral commission was forced to repeat that single election. Nicephore Soglo's Renaissance du Benin (RB) party won the new vote, paving the way for the former president to be elected Mayor of Cotonou by the new city council in February 2002.

National Assembly elections took place in March 2003 and were generally considered to be free and fair. Although there were some irregularities, these were not significant and did not greatly disrupt the proceedings or the results. These elections resulted in a loss of seats by RB—the primary opposition party. The other opposition parties, the Party for Democratic Renewal (PRD) led by the former Prime Minister Adrien Houngbedji and the Alliance Etoile (AE), joined the government coalition.

Former West African Development Bank Director Yayi Boni won the March 2006 election for the presidency in a field of 26 candidates. International observers including the United Nations, Economic Community of West African States (ECOWAS), and others called the election free, fair, and transparent. President Kérékou was barred from running under the 1990 constitution due to term and age limitations. President Yayi was inaugurated on April 6, 2006.

Benin held legislative elections on March 31, 2007, for the 83 seats in the National Assembly. The Force Cowrie for an Emerging Benin (FCBE), a coalition of parties, closely linked to President Yayi, won a plurality of the seats in the National Assembly, providing the president with considerable influence over the legislative agenda.

In March 2011,  President Boni Yayi was re-elected with 53.13 percent of vote in the first-round of the election. His main rival rejected the results, claiming widespread irregularities.

In October 2015, Benin's former President Mathieu Kerekou, who ruled the country a total of 28 years during his two spells as president (1972-1991 and 1996-2006), died at the age of 82.

After President Boni Yayi had served maximum two five-year terms, businessman Patrice Talon succeeded him. Talon defeated prime minister Lionel Zinsou, the candidate for Boni Yayi's Cowry Forces for an Emerging Benin (FCBE), in the March 2016 presidential election.

In April 2021,  incumbent Patrice Talon won re-election with 86 percent of the votes in the first round of the election. The change in election laws resulted in total control of parliament by president Talon’s supporters.

See also
History of Africa
History of West Africa
List of heads of government of Benin
List of heads of state of Benin
Politics of Benin
 Cotonou history and timeline

Notes

References

External links
Rulers.org — Benin – List of rulers for Benin

 
French West Africa